Bad Boys Bound is the second studio album by Japanese band Tokio. It was released on July 3, 1995. The album reached fourth place on the Oricon weekly chart and charted for four weeks.

Track listing

Personnel 

 Shigeru Joshima - guitar
 Tomoya Nagase - lead vocalist, guitar
 Masahiro Matsuoka - drums
 Taichi Kokubun - keyboard
 Tatsuya Yamaguchi - bass

References 

1995 albums
Tokio (band) albums